Mariana de Miguel, (born 1995) better known as Girl Ultra, is an R&B artist from Mexico City. She signed to Mexican label Finesse Records in 2016 and released her debut EP, Boys, in 2017. Boys includes a Spanish language cover of Daniel Caesar track "Get You". She released her second EP, Adiós, in 2018.

Early life and influences 
Mariana 'Nan' de Miguel was born and raised in Mexico City. She was part of a disco band called Affer in high school. Her influences included music by Beyoncé and Destiny's Child.

Collaboration with Cuco 
In 2019 Girl Ultra collaborated with Cuco on a bilingual song in English and Spanish called Damelove, recorded in Los Angeles.

Discography 
 Boys (EP, 2017)
 Adiós (EP, 2018)
 Nuevos Aires (First full-length album, 2019)
 EL SUR (EP, 2022)

References 

Musicians from Mexico City
Living people
1995 births